Phoxinus grumi is a species of freshwater fish in the family Cyprinidae. It is endemic to China.

References

Phoxinus
Taxa named by Lev Berg
Fish described in 1907